Mersheena Neenu is an Indian actress who predominantly works in the Malayalam television industry along with a few Tamil films and serials.

Personal life 
She is the younger sister of Actress Rasna, Paarijatham fame.

Acting career 
Neenu's first camera experience was when she was studying in UKG for an advertisement.

Neenu made her film acting debut with Wound in 2014. She also acted in tamil film as prominent role in Konjam Konjam (2017). She then did a guest appearance in Thamaasha (2019) malayalam movie. At the same time she acted in some television serials also. Ayalathe Sundari on Surya rose her fame among the Malayali audience, she acted as deaf and dumb.

Her debut tamil TV serial, Agni Natchathiram telecasted on Sun TV but the serial had to be abandoned due to the difficulty of traveling in Covid-19. She acted a negative role in Agni Natchathiram as Akhila, around 230 episodes.

In the meantime she start acting the lead role of Sathya Enna Penkutty on Zee Keralam. This tomboy character made her more popular among the Malayali audience.

Filmography

Films

Television

Musical album

References 

 I believe my roles must also help women know their inner strength: Mersheena Neenu By - TNNArya 10 December 2019
 Watch: Here's how Mersheena Neenu transforms into Satya By - TIMESOFINDIA.COM 10 June 2020
 From meeting with an accident to using a wig throughout the day; Satya Enna Penkutty's Mersheena Neenu opens up on the struggles in playing the rol By - TIMESOFINDIA.COM Radhika Nair 24 August 2020
 Did you know Mersheena Neenu is a huge fan of Jennifer Winget? By - TIMESOFINDIA.COM 3 July 2020
 Watch: Satya Enna Penkutty fame Neenu leaves fans shocked with her dedication in this BTS video By - TIMESOFINDIA.COM 25 November 2019
 Mersheena Neenu is elated to play a tomboy in 'Sathya Enna Penkutty' By - TIMESOFINDIA.COM 23 October 2019

External links 
 
 

Indian women television presenters
Living people
Indian film actresses
Actresses in Malayalam cinema
Actresses in Hindi cinema
21st-century Indian actresses
Tamil actresses
1998 births
Child actresses in Malayalam cinema
Actresses in Tamil television
Actresses in Malayalam television